A list of songs recorded by English musician Roger Waters as a solo artist.

List
All songs written by Roger Waters, except where noted.

Notes

References

Waters, Roger